The following is a list of films shot in Lone Pine, California and the surrounding area, including the Alabama Hills and Whitney Portal.

See also
 Lone Pine, California
 Lone Pine Film Festival
 Alabama Hills
 Whitney Portal, California

References

External links
 Alabama Hills, Lone Pine, California
 Lone Pine Museum of Film History

Films shot in California
Films shot in Lone Pine, California
Films by shot in Lone Pine
Lone Pine